Panchagnula Adinarayana Sastry (1890–1951) was a Scholar of Sanskrit and Telugu. He supported the "Navya sahitya movement" and "spoken telugu movement" led by Gidugu Venkata Ramamoorty. He established "Aryabharathi Granthamala" in 1930.

Biography
Sastry was born in 1890 to Venkateswarlu and Alvelumanga. He wrote many books in Telugu, Sanskrit, Pali and Hindi languages. His notable works are "Jainula mata kathalu" and "Gowthama Nyaya sutralu". These are written in Telugu. He translated "Vatsayana Kamasutralu" from Sanskrit.

Works
 Sthrijataka
 Sri Vemana Yogi Jeevitham (1917)
 Prakrutha grantha kartalu - Prajasevanu.
 Sri Bhadrachala Ramadasu Charitramu.

References

External links
 Biography of Panchagnula Adinarayana Sastry

1890 births
1951 deaths
Sanskrit scholars
Telugu writers